Carbon filament may refer to:
 A carbon filament in an incandescent light bulb
 Filaments in the synthesis of carbon fibre

See also
 Filamentous carbon